The 1967 Intertoto Cup was the first in which no knock-out rounds were contested, and therefore the first in which no winner was declared. The tournament was expanded, with 48 clubs and twelve groups compared to 40 clubs and ten groups the season before. Denmark participated for the first time.

Ruch Chorzów were the best performers, with 12 points.

Abandonment of knock-out rounds
The Group Stage was always played during the summer break, with the knock-out rounds played as clubs could fit them in during the new season. However, this began to cause increasing problems. Firstly, clubs often had difficulty agreeing dates, and the tournament struggled to finish on time - for example, the 1964–65 final wasn't played until early June, over a year after the group games had started; and in 1963–64 and 1965–66 it was concluded in late May.

The second reason was the insistence of UEFA that any clubs taking part in the European Cup or UEFA Cup Winners' Cup could not continue games in other European competitions after the end of the summer break. This meant that clubs who had progressed from the Intertoto Group Stage, but were also competing in one of the UEFA competitions, had to be given byes through the Intertoto knock-out rounds (until they were eliminated from the UEFA competition), or withdrawn entirely. This made the knock-out rounds complicated, difficult to schedule, and weakened their significance.

The third reason was the lack of value attributed to the knock-out rounds. While reaching the final was seen as an achievement worthy of praise, the main purpose of the tournament, for most clubs who entered, was to provide football during the otherwise empty summer break. The financial benefits of participating in the pools competitions was also important. Having to arrange and play home-and-away knock-out matches during the new season was seen as difficult, expensive, and relatively pointless if the club in question was eliminated before reaching the Final or Semi-finals.

As a result, the knock-out rounds were abandoned, and for the next three decades there were no winners of the cup. The Group Stage continued much as before, with prize money still awarded according to a club's final group placing.

Group stage
The teams were divided into twelve groups of four clubs each - four in 'A' section, and eight in 'B' section. Belgium, France, and the Netherlands had clubs in 'A'; while Austria, Czechoslovakia, Denmark, East Germany, Poland, Sweden and West Germany had clubs in 'B'. Clubs from Switzerland were placed in both sections.

Group A1

Group A2

Group A3

Group A4

Group B1

Group B2

Group B3

Group B4

Group B5

Group B6

Group B7

Group B8

See also
 1967–68 European Cup
 1967–68 UEFA Cup Winners' Cup
 1967–68 Inter-Cities Fairs Cup

External links
  by Pawel Mogielnicki

1967
4